Charles E. Freeman (December 12, 1933 – March 2, 2020) was an American attorney who served as a justice of the Illinois Supreme Court. He was elected to the position on November 6, 1990, becoming its first African-American justice. He served as chief justice from May 12, 1997, to January 1, 2000. He retired from the court on June 14, 2018.

Early life, family and education
Freeman was born in Richmond, Virginia. Freeman received his undergraduate degree from Virginia Union University in 1954 and J.D. degree from the John Marshall Law School in Chicago in 1962.

Career
Illinois Governor Otto Kerner appointed Freeman to the Illinois Industrial Commission in January 1965 as an arbitrator. Freeman heard thousands of work-related injury cases. In September 1973 Governor Dan Walker named Freeman to the Illinois Commerce Commission, a rate regulatory agency with power over telephone, electricity and gas companies. Freeman worked on the commission until December 1976.

Freeman also conducted a general law practice from 1962 until 1976, when he was elected to the Cook County Circuit Court. He served ten years on the court and swore in Harold Washington, a personal friend, as Mayor of Chicago. Freeman was a member of several bar associations and professional judiciary societies, and has won a number of awards throughout his career.

From his re-election in 2002, Freeman ranked as the senior member of the Illinois Supreme Court until his retirement in 2018. While on the court he showed particular interest in administrative reform and prosecutorial misconduct cases.

Personal life
Freeman was married to his wife, Marylee, until her death in 2013. They have one son, an attorney, and two grandchildren. Freeman died on March 2, 2020, in Chicago. He was 86.

See also
List of African-American jurists

References

External links
Charles E. Freeman at Illinois Supreme Court

1933 births
2020 deaths
Illinois state court judges
Justices of the Illinois Supreme Court
African-American judges
African-American people in Illinois politics
John Marshall Law School (Chicago) alumni
Virginia Union University alumni
Illinois Democrats
Lawyers from Chicago
Lawyers from Richmond, Virginia
20th-century American judges
21st-century American judges
20th-century African-American people
21st-century African-American people